The women's javelin throw at the 2010 European Athletics Championships was held at the Estadi Olímpic Lluís Companys on 27 and 29 July.

Medalists

Records

Schedule

Results

Qualification
Qualification: Qualification Performance 59.50 (Q) or at least 12 best performers advance to the final

Final

References
 Qualification Results
 Final Results

Javelin throw
Javelin throw at the European Athletics Championships
2010 in women's athletics